Tropaeolum umbellatum is a species of plant in the Tropaeolaceae family. It is endemic to Ecuador.  Its natural habitat is subtropical or tropical moist montane forests.

References

Endemic flora of Ecuador
umbellatum
Critically endangered plants
Taxonomy articles created by Polbot